Uravai Kaatha Kili is a 1984 Indian Tamil-language film written and directed by T. Rajendar. The film stars Rajendar, Saritha, Jeevitha and Major Sundarrajan. This film marked the first screen appearance of Rajendar's son Silambarasan.

Plot

Cast 

T. Rajendar in a dual role
Saritha
Jeevitha
Major Sundarrajan
S. S. Chandran
Usilai Mani
Sivaraman
Pushpalatha
Gandhimathi
Sangeetha
Nalini
Silambarasan as Silambarasu
Typist Gopu
Viji

Production 
Uravai Kaatha Kili marked the first screen appearance of Rajendar's son Silambarasan.

Soundtrack 
The music was composed by and lyrics were written by T. Rajendar.

References

External links 
 

1980s Tamil-language films
1984 films
Films directed by T. Rajendar
Films scored by T. Rajendar
Twins in Indian films